Frank Glasgow Tinker (July 14, 1909 – June 13, 1939) was an American volunteer fighter pilot for the Fuerzas Aéreas de la República Española  ("Air Forces of the Spanish Republic"; FARE), during the Spanish Civil War.

Tinker was credited officially with shooting down eight enemy aircraft and was the highest-scoring American air ace of the war. However, Tinker's logbook suggests that he claimed 19 victories, which would make him the sixth-highest scoring pilot in FARE. That relatively few of his claims were officially recognized was due to the complex system of verifying air kills used by FARE and the financial incentive paid to mercenaries: many victories were not verifiable because the downed aircraft crashed in an enemy-held area and/or an incentive would not have to be paid. In addition, Tinker and other pilots from Escuadrilla La Calle ("La Calle's Squadron"), also known as 1ª Escuadrilla de Chatos (1st Chato Squadron"), shared a number of joint kills against Junkers Ju 52 bombers.  He reported narrowly avoiding death at both the hands of enemy aviators and malfunctioning equipment.

He left a detailed record of his experiences as a fighter pilot for the Republicans in his memoir Some Still Live, published by Funk & Wagnalls Co in New York, 1938 and recently republished by The Clapton Press, London.

Early years
Frank "Salty" Tinker was born in Kaplan, Louisiana, and grew up in DeWitt, Arkansas. In 1926, he joined the US Navy hoping to become a naval aviator. In 1933, he graduated from the US Naval Academy. In 1934, he was assigned to US Navy aviation and became a pilot of a reconnaissance floatplane of the USS San Francisco cruiser. Because of problems with alcohol and brawls, he was dismissed from the Navy.

Later in 1935, Tinker joined the crew of a Standard Oil tanker running from New York to Baton Rouge, Louisiana, as a third mate. By July 1936, he left his job with Standard Oil, and looked for a job as a pilot.

Spanish Civil War
After the start of the Spanish Civil War, Tinker offered his service to a Republican side, reportedly because of his aversion to fascist regime of Benito Mussolini, who was helping the Spanish Nationalists. He negotiated a high salary of $1,500 monthly, and a premium of $1,000 for any aircraft he shot down. Under nom de guerre Francisco Gómez Trejo, he went to Spain via France.

For a short time, from January 6, 1937, Tinker served in a light bomber squadron, flying obsolete Breguet 19 bombers. From January 23, he, along with some other American pilots, was assigned to a fighter unit, 1st Escuadrilla de Chatos commanded by Andrés García La Calle, flying Soviet Polikarpov I-15 "Chato" biplanes. In 1937, he flew many combat missions against the Fascist Falange air forces, generally duelling Germans and Italians. The squadron first entered action on February 10, and took part in a Battle of Guadalajara. On March 14, Tinker shot down his first aircraft, an Italian Fiat CR.32 fighter, followed by another CR.32 on March 20. On April 17, he shot down a German Heinkel He 51 fighter from Legion Condor over Teruel.

On May 3, 1937, Tinker was assigned to 1st Escuadrilla de Moscas, commanded by the Russian, Ivan Lakyeyev, flying the faster Polikarpov I-16 "Mosca" monoplane fighters. On June 2 and June 16, he shot down another CR.32. On July 13, he became the first pilot to shoot down one of the most modern German fighters, a Messerschmitt Bf 109A, near Madrid. It was piloted by Unteroffizier Guido Honess of 2. Staffel/Jagdgruppe 88 (2./J 88), flying a Bf 109A believed to be marked 6–4. Honess, who was killed in the ensuing crash, was the first German pilot to achieve three victories with this new type of aircraft. On July 17, Tinker shot down another Bf 109A.  This first version of the Bf 109 was not a "good climber" and Tinker caught it from behind while the German pilot tried to gain altitude after a dive on him – a lethal mistake according to Tinker. The scene is described in detail in his book Some Still Live. His final victory was over a Fiat CR.32 on July 18, 1937. Tinker flew his last missions on July 29, 1937, then returned to the U.S.

While in Spain, Tinker socialized with Ernest Hemingway, Robert Hale Merriman, the leader of the American Volunteers of the Lincoln Brigade and his successor Milton Wolff, who led the 15th International Brigade during the Battle of the Ebro.

Later years and death
Eventually, Tinker fell victim to combat stress reaction due to the constant combat. After the war, Tinker was a guest speaker in New York on the radio program "We the People", discussing his feats in the Spanish Civil War. He wrote a number of articles including a series for the Arkansas Gazette Magazine describing his voyage from St. Charles (Arkansas County) down the White and Mississippi rivers to New Orleans with his fox terrier. Tinker also wrote a series of serial articles for The Saturday Evening Post titled "Some Still Live". These articles detailing his war experiences, were published in book form with the same name in 1938. Ernest Hemingway was notably a fan, lauding it to Maxwell Perkins. Hemingway's influence on the style is rather evident.

However, soon after the book was published, Tinker died, a purported suicide by a gunshot to his head in a Little Rock hotel.

The reasons for his death are still controversial and may relate to the harsh treatment he received from the FBI, due to his support of the Spanish Republican cause. Tinker asked to return to the U.S. Navy or U.S. Army as a pilot but he was rejected. He even threatened to return to Spain to continue fighting. At the end, he was haunted by the thought he had betrayed his comrades and himself. His colleague Albert John Baumler, nicknamed "Ajax" (from his name acronym A.J.), proposed joining the American and other foreign pilots then flying for the Chinese Nationalist Air Force. His signed request was found next to his death bed with an empty bottle of whiskey. On his tombstone, the local priest engraved the phrase in Spanish: ¿Quién Sabe?, meaning "Who knows?"

Arkansas Aviation Historical Society inducted Tinker into the Arkansas Aviation Hall of Fame in 1999.

On July 11, 2009, near the centennial of his birth, relatives, admirers and the Grand Prairie Historical Society participated in an observance and toast at Tinker's gravesite in DeWitt, Arkansas.

See also 
 Yankee Squadron
 PTSD

References

Bibliography

External links
Biplane fighter aces - Jr Frank Glasgow Tinker 
Frank Tinker: The American Ace in Spain
Flyers of Fortune: American Airmen in the Spanish Civil War

1909 births
1939 deaths
1939 suicides
Suicides by firearm in Arkansas
Spanish Civil War flying aces
United States Navy officers
American military personnel who committed suicide
United States Naval Aviators
Americans who served in foreign militaries
People from Kaplan, Louisiana
American people of the Spanish Civil War
People from DeWitt, Arkansas